The grass family Poaceae is the largest group of flowering plants present on the island of Puerto Rico.  With 258 species, it represents 9% of all Angiosperms and 33% of all Monocots.

The following is a list of grass species known to exist in Puerto Rico, separated by genus:

Agrostis
Agrostis hyemalis

Andropogon
Andropogon bicornis
Andropogon glomeratus
Andropogon gracilis
Andropogon leucostachyus
Andropogon virginicus

Anthephora
Anthephora hermaphrodita

Aristida
Aristida adscensionis
Aristida chaseae
Aristida portoricensis
Aristida refracta
Aristida spiciformis
Aristida suringarii
Aristida swartziana

Arthraxon
Arthraxon castratus

Arthrostylidium
Arthrostylidium farctum
Arthrostylidium multispicatum
Arthrostylidium sarmentosum

Arundinella
Arundinella hispida

Arundo
Arundo donax

Avena
Avena sativa

Axonopus
Axonopus aureus
Axonopus compressus
Axonopus fissifolius

Bambusa
Bambusa multiplex
Bambusa vulgaris

Bothriochloa
Bothriochloa ischaemum
Bothriochloa pertusa
Bothriochloa saccharoides

Bouteloua
Bouteloua americana
Bouteloua juncea
Bouteloua repens

Brachyelytrum
Brachyelytrum erectum

Cenchrus
Cenchrus brownii
Cenchrus echinatus
Cenchrus gracillimus
Cenchrus myosuroides
Cenchrus spinifex

Chloris
Chloris barbata
Chloris ciliata
Chloris cubensis
Chloris elata
Chloris radiata
Chloris sagraeana

Chusquea
Chusquea abietifolia

Coix
Coix lacryma-jobi

Cymbopogon
Cymbopogon citratus
Cymbopogon nardus

Cynodon
Cynodon dactylon
Cynodon nlemfuensis

Dactylis
Dactylis glomerata

Dactyloctenium
Dactyloctenium aegyptium

Dichanthelium
Dichanthelium aciculare
Dichanthelium acuminatum
Dichanthelium dichotomum
Dichanthelium leucothrix
Dichanthelium ovale
Dichanthelium sabulorum
Dichanthelium scoparium
Dichanthelium strigosum

Dichanthium
Dichanthium annulatum
Dichanthium aristatum

Diectomis
Diectomis fastigiata
Diectomis argillacea
Diectomis bicornis
Diectomis ciliaris
Diectomis dolichophylla
Diectomis eriantha
Diectomis horizontalis
Diectomis insularis
Diectomis ischaemum
Diectomis longiflora
Diectomis nuda
Diectomis panicea
Diectomis sanguinalis
Diectomis setigera
Diectomis similis
Diectomis villosa
Diectomis violascens

Echinochloa
Echinochloa colona
Echinochloa crus-galli
Echinochloa crus-pavonis
Echinochloa polystachya
Echinochloa stagnina

Eleusine
Eleusine indica

Eragrostis
Eragrostis amabilis
Eragrostis barrelieri
Eragrostis ciliaris
Eragrostis curvula
Eragrostis elliottii
Eragrostis glutinosa
Eragrostis hypnoides
Eragrostis pectinacea
Eragrostis pilosa
Eragrostis urbaniana

Eremochloa
Eremochloa ophiuroides

Eriochloa
Eriochloa polystachya
Eriochloa punctata

Eriochrysis
Eriochrysis cayennensis

Euclasta
Euclasta condylotricha

Eustachys
Eustachys petraea

Gymnopogon
Gymnopogon foliosus

Gynerium
Gynerium sagittatum

Hackelochloa
Hackelochloa granularis

Heteropogon
Heteropogon contortus

Holcus
Holcus lanatus

Homolepis
Homolepis glutinosa

Hymenachne
Hymenachne amplexicaulis

Hyparrhenia
Hyparrhenia rufa

Hypogynium
Hypogynium virgatum

Ichnanthus
Ichnanthus nemorosus
Ichnanthus pallens
Ichnanthus tenuis

Imperata
Imperata brasiliensis
Imperata contracta

Isachne
Isachne angustifolia

Lasiacis
Lasiacis divaricata
Lasiacis grisebachii
Lasiacis ligulata
Lasiacis sloanei
Lasiacis sorghoidea

Leersia
Leersia hexandra
Leersia monandra

Leptochloa
Leptochloa fusca
Leptochloa nealleyi
Leptochloa panicea
Leptochloa panicoides
Leptochloa scabra
Leptochloa virgata

Leptochloopsis
Leptochloopsis virgata

Leptocoryphium
Leptocoryphium lanatum

Lithachne
Lithachne pauciflora

Lolium
Lolium perenne

Melinis
Melinis minutiflora
Melinis repens

Microstegium
Microstegium vimineum

Muhlenbergia
Muhlenbergia capillaris

Olyra
Olyra latifolia

Oplismenus
Oplismenus hirtellus

Oryza
Oryza latifolia
Oryza sativa

Panicum
Panicum dichotomiflorum
Panicum diffusum
Panicum elephantipes
Panicum ghiesbreghtii
Panicum laxum
Panicum miliaceum
Panicum parvifolium
Panicum rigidulum
Panicum schiffneri
Panicum stenodes
Panicum stevensianum
Panicum tenerum
Panicum trichanthum
Panicum trichoides
Panicum venezuelae

Pappophorum
Pappophorum pappiferum

Paspalidium
Paspalidium chapmanii
Paspalidium geminatum

Paspalum
Paspalum arundinaceum
Paspalum bakeri
Paspalum blodgettii
Paspalum boscianum
Paspalum caespitosum
Paspalum clavuliferum
Paspalum conjugatum
Paspalum convexum
Paspalum decumbens
Paspalum densum
Paspalum dilatatum
Paspalum dispar
Paspalum distichum
Paspalum fasciculatum
Paspalum fimbriatum
Paspalum laxum
Paspalum macrophyllum
Paspalum maritimum
Paspalum millegrana
Paspalum minus
Paspalum molle
Paspalum notatum
Paspalum orbiculatum
Paspalum paniculatum
Paspalum parviflorum
Paspalum paucispicatum
Paspalum pleostachyum
Paspalum plicatulum
Paspalum pulchellum
Paspalum rupestre
Paspalum secans
Paspalum setaceum
Paspalum urvillei
Paspalum vaginatum
Paspalum virgatum

Pennisetum
Pennisetum ciliare
Pennisetum clandestinum
Pennisetum glaucum
Pennisetum polystachion
Pennisetum purpureum

Pharus
Pharus lappulaceus
Pharus latifolius
Pharus parvifolius

Phragmites
Phragmites australis

Poa
Poa annua
Poa pratensis

Polypogon
Polypogon viridis

Polytrias
Polytrias indica

Rottboellia
Rottboellia cochinchinensis

Saccharum
Saccharum officinarum
Saccharum spontaneum

Sacciolepis
Sacciolepis indica
Sacciolepis striata

Schizachyrium
Schizachyrium brevifolium
Schizachyrium sanguineum
Schizachyrium tenerum

Setaria
Setaria barbata
Setaria magna
Setaria parviflora
Setaria pradana
Setaria rariflora
Setaria setosa
Setaria tenacissima
Setaria utowanaea
Setaria vulpiseta

Sorghastrum
Sorghastrum setosum
Sorghastrum stipoides

Sorghum
Sorghum bicolor
Sorghum halepense

Spartina
Spartina patens

Sporobolus
Sporobolus cubensis
Sporobolus domingensis
Sporobolus indicus
Sporobolus pyramidatus
Sporobolus tenuissimus
Sporobolus virginicus

Stenotaphrum
Stenotaphrum secundatum

Themeda
Themeda arguens

Tragus
Tragus berteronianus

Tripidium
Tripidium bengalense

Tripsacum
Tripsacum fasciculatum
Tripsacum latifolium

Triticum
Triticum aestivum

Urochloa
Urochloa adspersa
Urochloa arrecta
Urochloa brizantha
Urochloa decumbens
Urochloa distachya
Urochloa fuscata
Urochloa maxima
Urochloa mosambicensis
Urochloa mutica
Urochloa plantaginea
Urochloa reptans

Vetiveria
Vetiveria zizanioides

Vulpia
Vulpia bromoides

Zea
Zea mays

Zoysia
Zoysia matrella
Zoysia tenuifolia

External links 
 Grasses of Puerto Rico factsheets

Grasses
Grasses
Puerto Rico
Puerto Rico list
Grasses, Puerto Rico